The Sacramento Philharmonic is a symphony orchestra in the Sacramento region, established in 1997 after the disbandment of the Sacramento Symphony that same year.  Led by Maestro Michael Morgan until his death in 2021, the orchestra performs at the Community Center Theatre and at the Mondavi Center at the University of California, Davis

History

Sacramento Symphony Orchestra 
The Sacramento Symphony was established in 1948 and rapidly became a large regional orchestra made up of local professional musicians.  However, starting in 1986 and continuing through the mid-1990s, the Sacramento Symphony had severe administrative difficulties and ran into significant operating deficits, repeatedly filing for bankruptcy.  Despite several moderate bail-outs from businesses, the general public and local government, in 1997 the Sacramento Symphony officially closed its doors.

Directors included Fritz Berens (1956?-1963?), who helped found the Sacramento Youth Symphony, Harry Newstone (1965–78), who oversaw the move from the Memorial Auditorium and the Hiram Johnson High School Auditorium (where most of the concerts were held ) to the new Community Center, Carter Nice (1979–92) and Geoffrey Simon.

The Sacramento Philharmonic 
Established the same year as the Symphony shut down, the new Sacramento Philharmonic, composed almost entirely of the same orchestra members, featured a significantly smaller schedule.  The Philharmonic, with the support of Sacramento County, sought to avoid the unfortunate fate of the defunct Symphony and requested several market studies from national firms to help determine the potential for professional orchestral music in the Sacramento region.  With a similar population to Cleveland, which has a world-famous orchestra in the highest calibre, the potential, as determined by the studies, seemed positive.

In 2013, the Sacramento Philharmonic merged with the Sacramento Opera to form the Sacramento Region Performing Arts Alliance. A year after the merger, the new group announced it would sit out the 2014–15 season due to financial problems and disagreements between leaders of the two formerly separate organizations.

In April 2015, the organization announced that it would reopen for the 2015–16 season. The group promoted its return with a series of surprise flash-mob style performances at locations throughout the city.

References 

1999 article at SFCV

Culture of Sacramento, California
Musical groups established in 1948
Arts organizations established in 1948
Orchestras based in California